Healthy, Wealthy and Wise was a lifestyle television program shown in Australia. It was shown on Network Ten and was aired from 1992 until 1998.

The show was created and produced by Michael Dickinson and Executive Producer Gavan Disney, once the producer of the Nine Network's long-running variety show Hey Hey it's Saturday and packaged by Disney Entertainment P/L for the Ten Network and its affiliates throughout the world.

Title

The title takes its name from the proverb, "Early to bed and early to rise, makes a man healthy, wealthy, and wise." This quote is often attributed to Benjamin Franklin since it appeared in his Poor Richard's Almanack; however, it was first used in print by John Clarke in a 1639 book of English and Latin proverbs.

Cast
Notable people associated with the programme included Felicity Kennett, wife of the then Premier of Victoria Jeff Kennett, and Jim Brown, a former Ten eyewitness news journalist.

Others such as Iain Hewitson used the opportunity to develop an ongoing TV career with the show as a starting point, including crafts lady Tonia Todman. The show's finance guru Ross Greenwood enjoyed particular success and became network finance editor on the Nine Network.

List of contributors

Some featured reporters and presenters on the show included:

Jacki MacDonald – Presenter (Season 1)
Ronnie Burns – Host/presenter
Felicity Kennett – Presenter (Seasons 6 & 7)
 Jim Brown – Travel
Ross Greenwood – Finance
Cherie de Haas – Naturopath
Iain Hewitson – Chef
Lyn Talbot – General reporter
Tonia Todman – Crafts
Peter Wherrett – Motoring (seasons 3–7)

Other broadcasts
The series was also broadcast on television in the U.A.E. on Channel 33, Bahrain TV Channel 55 in Bahrain and on the Australia Television network in various countries including Thailand, the Philippines, Hong Kong, Singapore, Malaysia, India, Sri Lanka, Taiwan, Maldives, Macau, Fiji, Indonesia, Papua New Guinea and Korea.

References

External links
 

Australian non-fiction television series
Network 10 original programming
1992 Australian television series debuts
1998 Australian television series endings
English-language television shows